Mike Judge Presents: Tales from the Tour Bus is an American animated docuseries television series created by Mike Judge, Richard Mullins and Dub Cornett that premiered on September 22, 2017 on Cinemax. It is Cinemax's only animated series.

Premise
The series is presented as a biographical oral history of musicians with each season focusing on a specific genre. It is narrated by Mike Judge and presents anecdotes of star performers as told by their families, bandmates, and close associates. Interview subjects are presented in rotoscope and their anecdotes in a contrasting cel animation style, interspersed with performance footage and news footage.

Production
On January 12, 2017, it was announced that Cinemax had given the production a series order for a first season consisting of eight episodes. The show was created by Mike Judge, Richard Mullins, and Dub Cornett. Judge and Cornett executive produce, Bob Engelman co-executive produces, and Mullins produces.

On May 16, 2018, it was announced that the series had been renewed for a second season moving the genre focus from country to the likes of James Brown and P-Funk. Joining the series creative team are Mark Monroe as a co-executive producer and Nelson George as a consulting producer. On October 4, 2018, it was reported that the second season would premiere on November 2, 2018.

Release
On September 14, 2017, Cinemax released the first official trailer for the series.

Episodes

Season 1 (2017)

Season 2 (2018)

Reception
The first season has been met with a positive response from critics. On the review aggregation website Rotten Tomatoes, the series holds a 100% approval rating with an average rating of 8.5 out of 10, based on 6 reviews. Metacritic, which uses a weighted average, assigned the series a score of 83 out of 100 based on 5 critics, indicating "universal acclaim".

References

External links

2010s American adult animated television series
2010s American animated comedy television series
2010s American musical comedy television series
2010s American documentary television series
2017 American television series debuts
2018 American television series endings
American adult animated comedy television series
American adult animated musical television series
English-language television shows
Cinemax original programming
Television series created by Mike Judge
Documentary television series about music